A Lost Lady is a 1923 book by Willa Cather.

A Lost Lady may also refer to:

A Lost Lady (1924 film), an American drama film based on the book
A Lost Lady (1934 film), based on the book
The Lost Lady: A Tragy Comedy, a 1637 play by William Berkeley